Thomas Jane (sometimes Jan; died September 1500) was a medieval Bishop of Norwich.

Educated at New College, Oxford, Jane was Rector of the Church of Saint Mary the Virgin in Hayes, Middlesex from 1473 to 1499. He was collated Archdeacon of Essex on 21 July 1480 and nominated to the bishopric on 14 June 1499 and was consecrated later in 1499, probably on 20 October. From 1496 to 1500 he was also a Canon of Windsor and Dean of the Chapel Royal.

Jane died in September 1500.

Citations

References
 

Archdeacons of Essex
Bishops of Norwich
Canons of Windsor
Deans of the Chapel Royal
15th-century English Roman Catholic bishops
15th-century births
1500 deaths
Year of birth missing